Toturbiykala (Uzun-otar) is a rural locality (a selo) in Khasavyurtovsky District, Republic of Dagestan, Russia. The population was 2,843 as of 2010. There are 28 streets.

Geography 
Toturbiykala is located 12 km southeast of Khasavyurt (the district's administrative centre) by road. Endirey is the nearest rural locality.

References 

Rural localities in Khasavyurtovsky District